Ibrahim Doundou Chefou is a Nigerien militant and a commander in the Islamic State in the Greater Sahara.

Background 
Chefou is believed to have the led the ambush of a convoy of U.S. and Nigerien troops in October 2017 that left four American and five Nigerien soldiers dead. Formerly a Fulani herder in the Niger-Mali border region, he initially took up arms to battle Tuareg cattle thieves. According to The New York Times, U.S. troops were attempting to locate Chefou in October 2017 when at least fifty militants purportedly led by him attacked them near the village of Tongo Tongo in southwestern Niger.

Chefou is believed by African officials to be one of the main propagators of unrest in the Sahel region. Niger's defense minister labeled him a "terrorist" and a "bandit".

See also

 Tongo Tongo ambush
 Insurgency in the Maghreb (2002–present)
 Islam in Niger
 Fulani herdsmen
 Niger Armed Forces

References

Islamic State of Iraq and the Levant members
Fula people
Living people
Nigerien Islamists
Year of birth missing (living people)